Elbogen or Ellenbogen (meaning elbow in German) may refer to:

 Elbogen, the German name for Loket, a town in the Czech Republic
 The Swedish city of Malmö, known as Elbogen in German during the 14th to 16th centuries
 The Elbogen, meteorite of the year 1400
 Ellenbogen (Rhön), one of the Rhön mountains in Germany
 , the tip of the island of Sylt and the northernmost point in Germany

People with the surname
 Eric Elbogen, founder of band Say Hi To Your Mom
 Gershon Ellenbogen (1917–2003), British barrister, author and Liberal Party politician
 Heinrich Elbogen (1872–1927),  Austrian sports shooter who competed in the 1912 Summer Olympics
 Henry Ellenbogen (1900–1985), American politician
 Ismar Elbogen (1874–1943), Polish-German rabbi
 Jenny Elbogen (1882–1957), German-speaking Esperantist and translator from Austria
 Marc S. Ellenbogen (born 1963), chairman of the Global Panel Foundation and president of the Prague Society